Eden Grove is an unincorporated community in Bruce County, Ontario. The community was also once called Pinkerton Station when it was used by the Canadian National Railway as a flag stop.

The community was once a stop on the Wellington, Grey and Bruce Railway, a shortline railway that ran in 19th Century to early 20th Century. The station building was repurposed for private use following the demise of the line.

References

Communities in Bruce County